Pentidotea aculeata is a species of isopod in the family Idoteidae.

References

Valvifera
Articles created by Qbugbot
Crustaceans described in 1913